The Dublin Fire Brigade (DFB) is the local authority fire and rescue service and ambulance service for Dublin City and the majority of the Greater Dublin Area. It is a branch of Dublin City Council. There are currently 14 fire stations staffed by DFB, 12 of which are full-time, the other 2 are "retained" they work of a pager system and have between 5 to 7 minutes to attend the station and turn out for the call,and operate on call 24/7 365 days a year with up to 500 calls per year. Full-time stations are staffed by shifts across 4 watches, A, B, C & D.  There are currently over 963 active firefighter/paramedic personnel making it the largest fire service based on personnel and resources in Ireland.

History

Dublin City's first two municipal fire engines were supplied in 1711 by John Oates, the city's water engineer and a manufacturer of water pumps. The Dublin Corporation paid Oates £6 to maintain the fire engines and a crew of six firefighters to attend any fire in the city. Throughout the second half of the 18th Century, insurance brigades were the primary source of firefighting for the city, operating independently for buildings bearing the mark of their respective insurance companies. Eventually the brigades began to co-operate on a competition basis with the first brigade on scene being the highest paid. It wasn't until 1862 with the enactment of the Dublin Corporation Act, that the city had an organised fire brigade. Dublin man J.R. Ingram became the first superintendent of the brigade, having worked as a fireman in New York and London. The brigade consisted of 24 men with a makeshift fire brigade station on Winetavern Street in The Liberties. In 1898 the Dublin Fire Brigade Ambulance Service was established. The turn of the century saw the brigade have its first fire stations and permanent headquarters built, with the first motorised fire engine entering service on 13 December 1909.

Stardust fire

In the early hours of 14 February 1981, Dublin Fire Brigade received a call reporting a fire in the Stardust nightclub in Artane. Units were dispatched from both Kilbarrack fire station and North Strand fire station. When the firemen arrived they were met with scenes of panic, disorder and suffering at what would turn out be one of the worst fire disasters in the history of the state. 48 people died and 214 people were injured as a result of the fire.

Fire stations 

There are currently 14 fire stations staffed by DFB, 12 of which are full-time, the other 2 are part-time or "retained". There were formerly stations at Tara Street (now the adjacent Central Fire Station), Winetavern Street, Buckingham Street Lower, Thomas Street, Dorset Street Upper, Rathmines, Blackrock, and Dún Laoghaire - the latter three had been built by their respective councils before DFB started operating across the whole of Dublin County.

 These are appliances crewed by the DFB but kept in reserve until needed at emergencies requiring specialist equipment. They are stored at stations across the capital but are not tied down to any one in particular.

Ambulance services 

Dublin Fire Brigade operates 14 ambulances on behalf of the Health Service Executive and 2 advanced paramedic response vehicles with staff rotating between fire and ambulance duties. Most firefighters are PHECC registered paramedics. Dublin Fire Brigade's fire and rescue resources are funded by and under the remit of Dublin City Council, and medical resources are funded by the HSE via service-level agreement from the National Ambulance Service annual budget.

Appliances and equipment 

Fire Appliances:
 Water Tender Ladder (Wt): D11, D12, D21, D22, D31, D32, D41, D42, D51, D61, D71, D72, D81, D91, D101, D102, D121, D122, D131, D231, D241
 Water Carrier (WrC): D19, D39, D109
 Turntable Ladder (TL): D106, D107
 Aerial Ladder Platform (ALP): D126
 Emergency Tender (ET): D25, D35
 Tunnel Response Vehicle (TRV): D45
 Chemical Incident Unit (CIU): D113
 Command Support Unit (CSU): 
 Incident Command Unit (DICU) 
 Incident Support Unit (ISU): D108
 Foam & Environmental Unit (FEU): 
 Foam Support Unit (FSU): D103
 Personnel Carrier Vehicle (PCV): D108
 Inshore Rescue Boat (IrbT)
 Prime Mover + HAZMAT Response Unit (PM+HRU): D123
 Prime Mover + Water Support Unit (PM+WSU): 
 Prime Mover (PM)

For Pods:
 Bulk Foam Unit (BFU)
 Major Incident Unit (MIU)

 District Officer's (DO): A, B, C, D, E, F

Emergency Ambulance Service Glossary/Callsigns:

 Advance Paramedic Response Unit (APRU): EMT-A1
 Advanced Paramedic Response Unit (ARPU): EMT-A2
 Ambulance (AMB): D14, D24, D34, D44, D144, D54, D64, D74, D84, D94, D104, D114, D124, D134

Training centre and museum 

The Dublin Fire Brigade Training Centre is located at the O'Brien Institute on the Malahide Road, Marino, Dublin 3. Recruit firefighter training as well as Paramedic training and specialised courses are held here. The centre also provides various other training courses such as fire marshal training and first aid training to private companies and individuals. The Dublin Fire Brigade Museum, established in 1985, was opened in its current site at the O'Brien Institute in 2008 and can be visited by appointment.

Ranks

See also
 Cork City Fire Brigade
 Garda Síochána
 HSE National Ambulance Service
 List of fire departments
 Civil Defence Ireland
 Irish Coast Guard

References

External links

 
 
 Dublin Fire Brigade on Irish Fire Services resource website
 
 

Organizations established in 1862
Fire departments
Fire and rescue services in the Republic of Ireland
Organisations based in Dublin (city)
Emergency services in the Republic of Ireland
Emergency medical services in the Republic of Ireland
1862 establishments in Ireland
Ambulance services in Ireland